Lourdes Klitzkie (born 2 February 1940) is a Guam long-distance runner. She competed in the women's marathon at the 1988 Summer Olympics.

References

External links
 

1940 births
Living people
Athletes (track and field) at the 1988 Summer Olympics
Guamanian female long-distance runners
Guamanian female marathon runners
Olympic track and field athletes of Guam
Place of birth missing (living people)
21st-century American women